A leadership election was held by the United States House of Representatives Democratic Caucus on November 17, 2006. The election determined who would be nominated by the caucus for Speaker of the House as well as who would occupy other leadership positions within the House Democratic Caucus in the 110th United States Congress. The following positions were nominated or elected on November 29: Speaker of the U.S. House of Representatives, House Majority Leader, House Majority Whip, House Assistant Majority Leader, Democratic Caucus Chair, and Democratic Caucus vice-Chair.

Nominee for Speaker

Candidates
 Rep. Nancy Pelosi (D-CA), House Minority Leader later became Speaker

Democratic Majority Leader

Candidates
 Rep. Steny Hoyer (D-MD), House Minority Whip later became Majority Leader
 Rep. John Murtha (D-PA)

Results

Democratic Majority Whip

Candidates
 Rep. Jim Clyburn (D-SC), House Caucus Chair later became Majority Whip

Withdrew
 Rep. Rahm Emanuel (D-IL), Chair of the Democratic Congressional Campaign Committee (withdrew to run for Caucus Chair)

Results

Democratic Caucus Chair

Candidates
 Rep. Rahm Emanuel (D-IL), DCCC Chair

Results

Democratic Caucus Vice-Chair

Candidates
 Rep. John Larson (D-CT), Incumbent Vice-Chair

Results

Democratic Party (United States) leadership elections
United States House of Representatives Democratic Caucus leadership election